Politizolators ( (singular); abbreviation for "political isolator") were special prisons in Soviet Russia and the Soviet Union to incarcerate political opponents of the Bolsheviks: Social Revolutionaries, mensheviks, Zionists, and anarchists, etc., as well as me members of the Left Opposition within the Bolshevik Party itself.

History 

The first politisolator was established in 1921 by conversion of the Vladimir Central Prison.

Initially they were subordinated to GPU NKVD RSFSR, unlike other prisons, which were subordinated to  ГУМЗ НКВД (State Directorate of the Places of Incarceration of NKVD). Under a separate subordination at that time was the infamous Solovki prison camp established in 1923, which also held political prisoners. Over time the subordination changed; these changes were poorly documented.

The NKVD Decree no. 00403 of November 11, 1935 signed by Genrikh Yagoda politisolators were renamed into NKVD special prisons (тюрьмы НКВД особого назначения). In 1937, Yagoda's successor Nikolay Yezhov, on the eve of Yezhovshchina,  complained that "... politisolators, I may say without an exaggeration, resemble the forced   rather than prisons", that the incarcerated have a complete freedom of assembly to develop their anti-Soviet plots, etc. These lax conditions were related to the operation of various organizations aiding political prisoners, such as the Political Red Cross.

Notable politisolators
Vladimir Central Prison
Suzdal PI, based of the prison of the Monastery of Saint Euthymius is Suzdal
, detailed in a two-volume monograph by  Aleksey Yalovenko
Yaroslavl PI (based on the Yaroslavl katorga transit prison (Ярославская Временно-каторжная тюрьма); now ) in the village of  )
Chelyabinsk PI (Челябинский политизолятор), based on the Chelyabinsk transit prison
Tobolsk PI (Тобольский политизолятор).

References

Political repression in the Soviet Union
NKVD
1921 establishments in Russia
1935 disestablishments in the Soviet Union